The 1995 South Asian Gold Cup is an international football tournament held in Sri Lanka from 25 March to 2 April 1995. The five national teams involved in the tournament were required to register a squad of 23 players, including three goalkeepers. Only players in these squads were eligible to take part in the tournament.

Bangladesh
Coach: Kang Man-young
Mohammed Jewel Rana
Satyajit Das Rupu
Nurul Haque Manik
Alamgir Hasan
Arif Hossain Moon
Rakib Hossain
Mamun Joarder
Monem Munna
Mohammed Ponir
Mizanur Rahman Mizan
Alfaz Ahmed
Imtiaz Ahmed Nakib
Shahidul Ahmed Ranjan

India
Coach: Rustam Akramov
Baichung Bhutia
Aqueel Ansari
Mohammed Yusuf Ansari
Carlton Chapman
Bruno Coutinho
K. V. Dhanesh
Aloke Das
Savio Medeira
Jo Paul Ancheri
VP Sathyan
Amrik Singh
Syed Sabir Pasha
Jiju Jacob
Naushad Moosa
Sumit Mukherjee
Tauseef Jamal
Tejinder Kumar
Kuljit Singh

Pakistan
Coach:  PFF coaching committees
Zahir Ahma
Pervez Ahmed
Mohammed Azhar
Abdool Farooq
Mohammed Imtiaz Butt
Zafar Iqbal
Mohammed Noman
Nawaz Rehman
Mohammed Tariq
Mohammed Younis
Haroon Yousuf
Nadeen Sohail
Saqib Abbas

Nepal
Coach: Yogambar Suwal
Deepak Amataya
Dev Narayan Choudhari
Bal Gopal Maharajan
Rajesh Manandhar
Umesh Pradhan
Gyanendra Prasad
Birat Jung Shahi
Raju Kaji Shakya
Surya Man Shrestha
Upendra Man Singh
Rajesh Thapa
Narenura Man
Babu Kaji Dhoubanjar
Gyanenora Prasad
Hari Khadka

Sri Lanka
Coach:  Jorge Ferreira
Mohamed Amanulla
Roshan Perera
Prabath Ferdinand
Junaideen Hasheemdeen
Liyanage Perera
Sampath Perera
Imthiyas Raheem
Mohamed Riza
Jagath Rohana
Anton Wambeck
Lalith Weerasinghe
Sm Rizwan
Ajith Prasanna
Majula Chaminda Sirisena
David Sarath Wellage

References

Asian football clubs in international competitions
SAFF Championship
Association football tournament squads
SAFF Championship squads